AirExplore is a Slovak charter airline headquartered and based at Bratislava Airport. The airline is IOSA certified and is a member of AIR-E, Airlines International Representation in Europe.

Operations
AirExplore operates a fleet of 8 passenger aircraft and a single cargo aircraft, all Boeing 737-800. The airline specialises in leasing (ACMI) its aircraft to many different airlines around the world, mainly for seasonal operations, but it also operates chartered flights for tour operators, sports teams and other companies.

The airline started operations in 2010 with a single Boeing 737-400 aircraft. It expanded its fleet by adding a Boeing 737-300 aircraft to it in 2011, before introducing an additional three Boeing 737-400 aircraft until 2014. Between 2014 and 2019, it gradually updated its fleet to only include Boeing 737-800 aircraft.

In July 2020, the airline introduced scheduled flights between Bratislava and Split, flying the route twice a week during the summer season. Since then, it has also operated scheduled flights between Košice and Zadar once a week during the summer season as well as between Bratislava and Stockholm every two weeks year-round.

On 25 August 2022, the airline took delivery of its first cargo aircraft, a converted Boeing 737-800, which it operates on behalf of RDS Cargo Group.

Fleet

Current fleet

As of August 2022 the fleet of AirExplore consists of the following aircraft:

Previously operated
 1 Boeing 737-300
 4 Boeing 737-400
 2 Boeing 737-800

References

External links

Official website

Airlines of Slovakia
Slovakian companies established in 2008
Airlines established in 2008